Willow Glen Elementary School may refer to:

 Willow Glen Elementary School, located in the San Jose Unified School District, California
 Willow Glen Elementary School, located in the Visalia Unified School District, California